KLSC (92.9 FM) is a radio station broadcasting a top 40 (CHR) format. Licensed to Malden, Missouri, United States, the station is currently owned by Max Media and licensed to MRR License LLC.

History
The station was assigned the call letters KMAL-FM on September 17, 1999. On December 10, 1999, the station changed its call sign to the current KLSC.

On June 1, 2018, KLSC changed their format from ESPN sports to contemporary hit radio, branded as "Hot 92.9".

Ownership
In December 2003, Mississippi River Radio, acting as Max Media LLC (John Trinder, president/COO), reached an agreement to purchase WCIL, WCIL-FM, WJPF, WOOZ-FM, WUEZ, WXLT, KCGQ-FM, KEZS-FM, KGIR, KGKS, KJEZ, KKLR-FM, KLSC, KMAL, KSIM, KWOC, and KZIM from the Zimmer Radio Group (James L. Zimmer, owner). The reported value of this 17 station transaction was $43 million.

Previous logo

References

External links
KLSC's official website

LSC
Contemporary hit radio stations in the United States
Radio stations established in 1980
Max Media radio stations
1980 establishments in Missouri